Night Tracks is an American television series which ran from 1983 to 1992 on Super Station WTBS (later known as TBS Super Station) on late night weekends. It premiered on Friday, June 3, 1983, and the first music video it aired was "Family Man" by Hall & Oates, from their H2O album.

Night Tracks was created and produced by Tom Lynch and Gary Biller 
(Lynch/Biller Productions).

Programming
Night Tracks produced shows were (in chronological order):

Night Tracks (1983–1992)
Night Tracks was the main program, composed (until 1989) of two three-hour blocks of music videos. On Friday the program normally began at 12:05 AM Eastern Time/9:05 PM Pacific Time and ran through the night until 6:00 AM ET/3:00 AM PT. On Saturday the two blocks were repeated, but in reverse order. (This was done partly because sporting events programming such as Braves Baseball on TBS and NBA on TBS ran overtime into the Night Tracks timeslot. On those nights Night Tracks would end before the entirety of block two had been aired.)

Interest in music videos began to wane in the late 1980s. USA Network cancelled its Radio 1990 video program in 1986; MTV suffered a ratings slump that same year that led it to replace its original crew of video jockeys and begin creating non-music programs; and in the summer of 1987, Friday Night Videos was pushed back an hour to accommodate a Friday episode of the higher-rated Late Night with David Letterman. In 1989 TBS began cutting back the amount of airtime devoted to music videos. Beginning in March, 1989, the Friday night schedule comprised one hour of Power Play (see below) and one three-hour block of videos, beginning at 1:00 AM ET/10:00 PM PT. TBS assigned the cut three hours to live sports events on Friday evenings and reruns of Hogan's Heroes and Gomer Pyle, U.S.M.C. early Saturday mornings. That August, TBS reduced Night Tracks to two and a half hours on Friday, and Chartbusters (see below) plus two two-hour blocks on Saturday, while the remaining hours each night were assigned to Night Flicks (which was simply a movie, standard TBS evening fare, with the Night Tracks theme music and announcer introducing the commercial breaks).  In the spring of 1990, it was further reduced to two 90 minute blocks. (This meant that it was possible to see the first 90-minute block again (albeit in abbreviated form just before the cut off time) on the same night.)

In the spring of 1991, Night Tracks introduced "College Crush Groove", two 30-minute blocks of alternative music videos in addition to two one-hour blocks of the customary top 40 videos. The next August, Night Tracks became wholly devoted to alternative and rap, adopting the slogan "The Music That Matters". However, the ratings did not significantly improve. TBS replaced more of Night Tracks airtime with the now-renamed Nite Flix on May 15, 1992 and eventually cancelled Night Tracks altogether. Friday, May 29, 1992 saw the final episode, albeit in an abbreviated 40 minute airing. The only program that aired on the night of Saturday, May 30, 1992 was New Alternative Express.

America's Music Tracks (1983–1984)
Following Night Tracks success, WTBS launched a one-hour, country music-oriented version with different voiceover announcers (though the same chyron font for music video identification was used). It premiered on Sunday, October 2, 1983 at 8:05 PM Eastern Time/5:05 PM Pacific Time. The show ran for 15 weeks before it was canceled in February 1984.

Chartbusters (1984–1991)
Chartbusters was an hour-long Top 10 (changed to Top 20 in 1990) music video show countdown that aired on Saturday nights preceding Night Tracks. It premiered on May 19, 1984, and its chart listing was associated with Kal Rudman's Friday Morning Quarterback. The show also aired an additional BREAKER video that was predicted to hit the charts in the following weeks.

Power Play (1985–1988)
Power Play was an hour of top-ranking music videos that aired on Friday nights preceding Night Tracks. It premiered on October 4, 1985. This brought the total time to a peak of 14 hours of music videos aired each weekend.

Power Play Dancin (1988–1989)
Power Play Dancin was an hour-long Top 10 dance video block which replaced Power Play.

Power Hits (1989–1990)
Power Hits was an hour of hard rock music videos which replaced Power Play Dancin. It was canceled in February 1990, and nothing music-related was put in its place.

Night Flicks (1989–1991) 
Night Flicks was a two-hour movie presentation (a different movie on Friday and Saturday) that used the Night Tracks theme music. The name Night Flicks had originated on Night Tracks as a movie trailer commercial segment. Over time, it replaced most of Night Tracks, and the title was changed to Nite Flix in 1991; under this name, it lasted into 1994.

New Alternative Express (1991–1992)
New Alternative Express was an hour-long Top 10 alternative video block, replacing Chartbusters. Its final episode aired on Saturday, May 30, 1992 (early morning Sunday, May 31 in most time zones) and officially signaled the end of the Night Tracks franchise.

Night Tracks DJs
This list only includes permanent announcers, a.k.a. the DJs of Night Tracks, and not announcers filling in such as Bill Brummel and others.

 Bob Coburn (1983–1986): later hosted the national call-in radio show Rockline and also at KLOS; died on December 17, 2016
 Joanne Ehrhart (Kreindel) (1983–1989)
 Frazer Smith (1986–1988, 1989–1991)
 Mike Carruthers (1988–1989): currently hosting Something You Should Know
 Cynthia Fox (1989–1991): formerly at KSWD
 Phillip Philistine (1991–1992)
 Nile Fair (1991–1992)
 Heath Adams (1992)

The announcers' faces were never seen except during a special year-end show in 1991. During a typical Night Tracks show they would mention artists and music videos that would be aired within the hour. They would also mention facts and information about the artists just before the videos were aired. The announcers were also heard in these segments during the show:

 "The Night Tracks' New Music Video of the Week"
 "The Night Tracks' New Music Spotlight" (changed to "The Night Tracks' New Music Preview" in 1989) – Highlighting a new artist to Night Tracks just before that artist's debut video is aired.
 "The Night Tracks' Original Classic" – A classic music video is aired with info on that artist.
 "The Night Tracks' World Premiere" – Occasionally Night Tracks would have the privilege of being the first to air a particular music video. The announcers would thank the people at the record company for the arrangement.
 "The Night Tracks' Inside Track" – A short one-question interview segment just before that artist's video is aired.

Celebrity guest Night Tracks VJs
Pet Shop Boys (November 1988)
Taylor Dayne (December 1988)

See also
Cable Music Channel
The Tube Music Network

References

External links

WTBS Night Tracks group (Facebook)
Night Tracks WTBS group (Yahoo!)
Night Tracks bumper music at the Television Production Music Museum

1983 American television series debuts
1980s American music television series
1990s American music television series
TBS (American TV channel) original programming
1992 American television series endings